Vehicle registration plates of the Virgin Islands may refer to:
Vehicle registration plates of the British Virgin Islands
Vehicle registration plates of the United States Virgin Islands